Fylde Coast Medical Services is a provider of Out of Hours medical services for the Blackpool, Fylde and Wyre areas.

The company was established in 1994 as a non-profit making GP co-operative.  It now has more than a hundred clinical members.

In 2013 it was chosen to run Silver Line, a telephone service aimed at older people who feel isolated.

Apart from the Out of Hours service provided for GPs, which is integrated with the NHS 111 service for the area, it manages the front Gateway at the Blackpool Victoria Hospital Urgent Care Centre and the out of hours dental service for the area.  From October 2017 it looks after patients with minor injuries, instead of the doctors in A&E, as well as less serious illnesses.

It runs The Silver Line a national free confidential telephone helpline offering information, friendship and advice to older people in the United Kingdom, and provides space for Addaction, a drug and alcohol treatment centre, in its offices at Whitegate Drive, Blackpool.

In 2014, FCMS, in conjunction with local health commissioners, became the Single point of access for the Care Coordination Scheme. Dealing with the top 1000 patients in Blackpool, the scheme aims to stop reoccurring attendances to Accident and Emergency. Instead, the patient can be redirect to the local healthcare community services, such as District Nursing Teams and the Hospice at Home service, run in conjunction with Trinity Hospice. The service now boasts over 6000 patients on its register. 

The organisation has been part of the North West NHS 111 provision with the North West Ambulance Service and Urgent Care 24 from October 1, 2015.

It is part of the pilot project for the integrated digital care record run by Channel 3 Consulting on behalf of Doncaster Clinical Commissioning Group.

References

External-Links

FCMS

Private providers of NHS services
Organisations based in Lancashire
Medical and health organisations based in England